St Petroc's Church, Bodmin, also known as Bodmin Parish Church, was a Roman Catholic Church until the reformation and is currently an Anglican parish church in the town of Bodmin, Cornwall, England, United Kingdom.

The existing church building is dated 1469–1472 and was until the building of Truro Cathedral the largest church in Cornwall. The tower which remains from the original Norman church and stands on the north side of the church (the upper part is 15th century) was until the loss of its spire in 1699 150 ft high. The building underwent two Victorian restorations and another in 1930. It is now listed Grade I. Part of the church is the Regimental Chapel of the Duke of Cornwall's Light Infantry dedicated in 1933.

The parish of Bodmin is now grouped with Cardinham, Lanivet and Lanhydrock parishes. There is a chapel at Nanstallon.

Features of St Petroc's Church

Prior Vyvyan's tomb
There are a number of interesting monuments, most notably that of Prior Vivian which was formerly in the Priory Church (Thomas Vivian's effigy lying on a chest: black Catacleuse stone and grey marble). Thomas Vyvyan (or Vivian), the penultimate prior of Bodmin Priory, was consecrated bishop of the titular see of Megara in Greece in 1517. As a bishop he could relieve Bishop Oldham of Exeter by acting as his suffragan in the archdeaconry of Cornwall. At Rialton, chief manor of the priory, Prior Vyvyan, a Cornishman, had already built c. 1510 a good residence for himself; parts of this structure are still extant. His tomb was not destroyed at the Reformation but relocated in the parish church.

Baptismal font

The font of a type common in Cornwall is of the 12th century: large and finely carved. The type may also be found at Altarnun and elsewhere but Bodmin's font is the largest and most highly ornamented of any of this type.

Woodwork
Screen, pulpit and bench-ends
In 1491 Matthy More undertook the reseating of the church and the building of the rood screen and pulpit. His work took four years and he was paid "about £400 in our money" (estimated in 1937). Parts of his work survive in the bench-ends and panels of the screen which have been re-used in the Corporation seats, wall panelling, reredos, pulpit and modern screen.

Misericords
Unusually, the three, late 15th century misericords have at some point been taken from their original stalls (which may not even have been in St Petroc's) and fitted into the lectern. Although dating evidence is scanty, it is believed that the transfer happened sometime in the 18th century.

Bells
There is a peal of eight bells: the tenor bell weighs 17-0-11.

Organ
The organ was installed in 1775 by Brice Seede. It has subsequently been restored and modified by Hele & Co in 1885, Percy Daniel in 1931 and Hele & Co in 1936. A specification of the organ can be found on the National Pipe Organ Register.

Churchyard
The churchyard is extensive and on a slope: the Chapel of St Thomas Becket is a ruin of a 14th-century building in the south-east of the churchyard. St Guron's Well is a small building of granite at the western entrance to the churchyard.

History

The early history of the monastic community of Bodmin is obscure; however the name "Bodmin" derives from the Cornish for "house of the monks" so the use of this name must have followed the establishment of the monastery. According to tradition, after founding a monastery at Padstow, Saint Petroc founded another monastery in Bodmin in the 6th century and gave the town its alternative name of Petrockstow. The legends of St Petroc associate him with monasteries in Padstow and Bodmin; but that at Bodmin may have been founded as a daughter house of Padstow (also called Petrockstow or Aldestow) after his death. St Guron is said to have preceded him here. The foundation of the monastery is also attributed to King Athelstan though it probably existed before his time, and was destroyed in a Danish raid in 981 AD. It must have been revived since it was a considerable landholder in the reign of Edward the Confessor.

Domesday Book records that parts of its lands had been taken from it by the Count of Mortain while others had been retained. The holdings were mainly in the hundreds of Trigg and Pydar and at the time of Domesday the monastery still held 18 manors, including Bodmin, Padstow and Rialton. These three manors were held by the monastery itself as well as Ellenglaze, Withiel and Treknow; Nancekuke, Tregole and Fursnewth were let to separate tenants and Coswarth was held by the king. Robert, Count of Mortain held from the monastery the manors of Tywarnhayle, Halwyn, Callestick, Cargoll, Treloy, St Enoder and  Bossiney; lands in Tregona, Trevornick, Trenhale, Tolcarne, Tremore, Lancarffe and Treninnick were taken from the monastery by Count Robert and in 1086 they were held by his tenants.

William Warelwast, Bishop of Exeter, established a house of regular Augustinian canons here ca. 1120. After St Petroc's relics were stolen in 1177 they were recovered and returned to Prior Roger (the ivory casket in which they were kept has survived to the present day). In the reign of King Henry VIII the priory was suppressed and the site granted to Thomas Sternhold. Until that time the choir had been used by the canons and the nave by the parishioners of Bodmin. In John Leland's Itinerary he records that "monkes, then nunnys, then seculare prestes, then monkes agayne, and last canons regular" had possessed the church. He reports that the priory buildings stood at the east-southeast end of the churchyard. Some fragments of stonework have been found and are preserved at Priory House.

John Wallis
John Wallis was Vicar of Bodmin from 1817 to his death in 1866; he served as mayor of Bodmin in 1822 and was the author of many topographical works. His works include The Cornwall Register: containing collections relative to the past and present state of the 209 parishes, forming the county, archdeaconry, parliamentary divisions, and poor law unions of Cornwall; to which is added a brief view of the adjoining towns and parishes in Devon, from Hartland to Plymouth (Bodmin: printed by Liddell & Son, 1847); which was preceded by The Bodmin Register: containing collections relative to the past and present state of the parish of Bodmin : and also, a statistical view of the twenty-eight parishes within a circle of eight miles round Bodmin church : together with many particulars and statistical tables concerning the county, archdeaconry, parliamentary districts, and poor law unions of Cornwall: with an appendix on the diocese of Exeter &c. (Bodmin: printed by Liddell & Son, 1838).

Parish status

The church is in a joint parish with:
St Hydroc's Church, Lanhydrock
Lanivet Church
St Stephen's Church, Nanstallon (chapel-of-ease)

References

External links

Bosvenegh in Cornish Wikipedia includes a good view of the church

Church of England church buildings in Cornwall
Grade I listed churches in Cornwall
English Gothic architecture in Cornwall
Duke of Cornwall's Light Infantry
Churches in Bodmin
15th-century church buildings in England
Anglo-Catholic church buildings in Cornwall
Churches dedicated to St Petroc